Emydopoidea is a group of Late Permian dicynodont therapsids. It includes the small-bodied Emydops, Myosaurus, and kingoriids, and the burrowing cistecephalids. Below is a cladogram from Kammerer et al. (2011) showing the phylogenetic relationships of emydopoids:

References

Dicynodonts
Lopingian first appearances
Middle Triassic extinctions